Manager of the Year may refer to:

 Major League Baseball Manager of the Year Award
 League Managers Association Manager of the Year
 Premier League Manager of the Season